Land of Legends is a 2022 Russian epic historical fantasy film directed by Anton Megerdichev. It is an adaptation of the historical novel Heart of Parma (ru) written by Alexei Ivanov and published in 2003. The book is based on the events of the 15th century and talks about the conquest of Great Perm by Moscow. The film stars Aleksandr Kuznetsov, Yevgeny Mironov, Fyodor Bondarchuk, Elena Erbakova, Sergei Puskepalis, and Aleksey Rozin joining the cast. 

Principal photography began in August 2019 and ended in February 2020, the film was shot on the territory of the Perm Krai, and the Moscow Oblast were selected. Unique scenery were built on the banks of the Usva and Kosva rivers: wooden and stone cities, fortresses, stilt houses.

It was released in wide release on October 6, 2022, by Central Partnership.

Plot 
The film takes place in the 15th century in the Ural, which Moscow troops want to capture. Mikhail, Prince of Great Perm with the help of local residents and old gods will try to fight back.

According to the authors, the epic drama Heart of Parma is the history of the confrontation between two worlds: the Grand Duchy of Moscow and the Ural Parma, the ancient Perm lands inhabited by pagans. Here heroes and ghosts, princes and shamans, Voguls and Muscovites will clash. At the center of the conflict of civilizations is the fate of the Russian prince Mikhail, who fell in love with the young Tiche, a witch-lamia capable of taking on the form of a lynx. Passion for the pagan and fidelity to forbidden love, a campaign against the Voguls, bloody battles and a short peace, the battle between Grand Duchy of Moscow and Parma, the hero will face trials in which it is not so terrible to part with life as to commit treason.

Cast 
 Aleksandr Kuznetsov as Permian prince Mikhail Yermolaevich, a centurion of the Komi-Permian, ruler of the Grand Duchy of Great Perm principality.
 Yaroslav Beloborodov as Prince Mikhail Yermolaevich as a child
 Yevgeny Mironov as Baptist Jonah
 Fyodor Bondarchuk as Grand prince Ivan III Vasilyevich of Russia, Grand Duke of Moscow
 Elena Erbakova as Tiche, lamia the sorceress, Prince Mikhail's wife
 Vitali Kishchenko as Fyodor Davydovich Motley
 Aleksandr Gorbatov as Prince Yermolay
 Valentin Tszin as Assyka is a Khakan (prince), the Vogul city of Pelym. 
 Sergei Puskepalis as Cherdyn voivode Polyud could have ended up in the city of Cherdyn.
 Mikhail Evlanov as Danila Venets
 Vladimir Lyubimtsev as Permian prince Burmot - voivode, Prince Mikhail's friend
 Islam Zafesov as Shiban Isur, voivode, the Tatar city of Afkul, Prince Mikhail's friend
 Aleksey Rozin as Pitirim
 Yelena Panova as Tabarga
 Roza Khayrullina as Aichel
 Ilya Malanin as Prince Michkin of Uros
 Miroslava Mikhailova as Masha

Production

Development 
In 2005, the rights to the film adaptation were bought by the Central Partnership company, the director of the TV series Brigada by Aleksey Sidorov, was supposed to be the director. 
In July 2008, it became known that the company did not intend to make the film. In 2014, Star Media Company acquired the rights to film adaptation of the novel from Alexei Ivanov. The film was originally directed by Sergei Bodrov. He later withdrew from the production due to being busy, but remained as screenwriter. 

On March 21, 2019, at the pitching of the film companies leading the Cinema Foundation of Russia, producer Igor Tolstunov announced the cast of the film adaptation of Alexei Ivanov's novel Heart of Parma, which will be directed by Anton Megerdichev, responsible for the film Going Vertical (2017).

Casting 
So, the main role - Prince Mikhail - will be played by Aleksandr Kuznetsov, known for the films The Scythian. His wife Tiche   will be played by Elena Erbakova, an actress from Ulan-Ude, for her this will be a film debut. The role of Bishop Jonah went to Yevgeny Mironov, and the role of  Grand Prince Ivan III will be played by Fyodor Bondarchuk.

Filming 
According to the film group, the filming will soon be completed on the territory of the Perm Krai.

In the village of Schegolevo, Ramensky District, Moscow Oblast, and in the vicinity of Gubakha, Perm Krai, unique decorations were built on the banks of the Usva and Vishera River: wooden and stone cities, fortresses, and houses on stilts. Heart of Parma is already considered one of the most difficult staged projects of Russian cinema.

In total, more than 2,000 people took part in the project during the entire filming period, including a film crew of 150 people. The extras, recruited in the area of the town of Gubakha, where the filming took place, deliberately did not shave their beards for several months in order to appear in both the summer and winter blocks. 

The costumes of the inhabitants of the fictional water city of Uros were made to order from real fish skin.

At the end of filming in Gubakha, the producers of the project decided not to disassemble the scenery, but to use the built city as a historical and tourist site. The large-scale decoration "Cherdyn" was donated to the city administration. It is planned to make an observation deck on the site of the city's scenery and install information boards with QR codes that will direct you to a site that tells about the sights of Gubakha and the filming of the project.

Post-production 
The film includes large-scale battle scenes, special effects, and carefully designed costume details, props, and weapons.

Release 
On August 26, 2022, the film opened the screening program of the 44th Moscow International Film Festival.

Land of Legends premiered at the "Karo 11 October" cinema in Moscow on September 28, and in Perm on October 5, 2022. It was theatrically released in the Russian Federation from October 6, 2022.

References

External links 
 

2020s Russian-language films

2020s historical action films
2020s historical fantasy films
2020s historical drama films
2022 fantasy films
2020s fantasy action films
2020s fantasy drama films
2020s action war films
Historical epic films
Epic fantasy films
Fantasy war films
War epic films
Russian epic films
Russian historical action films
Russian historical drama films
Russian fantasy action films
Russian fantasy drama films
Russian action war films
Biographical films about Russian royalty
Kievan Rus in fiction
Monarchy in fiction
Siege films
Films based on short fiction
War films based on actual events
Films based on European myths and legends
Films set in Ural
Films shot in Moscow Oblast
Films shot in Perm Krai